Chicago Blues All-Stars is an American blues band based in Chicago that incorporates elements of funk, soul, R&B and hip hop. Chicago Blues All-Stars is made up of musicians that have been together as friends and musicians for four decades. The band includes numerous inductees in the Chicago Blues Hall of Fame and has been a headliner for shows such as Buddy Guy's Legends featured on PBS and at music venues Kingston Mines and House Of Blues. "Killer" Ray Allison, a W.C. Handy Award winner, and Daniel "Chicago Slim" Ivankovich, who has played with Bo Diddley, Otis Rush and Buddy Guy, are the band leaders, co-founders, and Blues Hall of Fame inductees. Chicago Blues All-Stars have recorded with and performed with Chuck Berry, Paul Butterfield, Eric Clapton, Joe Cocker, James Cotton, Buddy Guy, Junior Wells, John Lee Hooker, Howlin’ Wolf, Albert King, B.B. King, Magic Sam, Gary Moore, Ohio Players, The Rolling Stones, Otis Rush, Koko Taylor, Big Mama Thornton, Muddy Waters and Johnny Winter.

Chicago Blues All-Stars has also performed in festivals such as the "Rockin' For The Troops" concert, an event held in Chicago to support service men and women in the military and the Fifteenth Annual Fountain Blues Festival.

History
Ray Allison, a featured performer in Muddy Waters and The Rolling Stones Live at the Checkerboard Lounge, Chicago 1981, and Daniel Ivankovich, an orthopedic surgeon who once was musical director for Otis Rush, met at the ChicagoFest Blues stage on Navy Pier in the 1980s. In 2007, Allison and Ivankovich formed the Chicago Blues All-Stars to create a new millennium version of their sound. They wanted to create a music revue that people unfamiliar with blues music could experience and get excited about. Additionally, they wanted to reach a younger audience that was interested in a variety of music but to catch their attention with blues.

Allison died in 2016, aged 60.

Reception
Chicago Blues All-Stars has received radio play on over 200 stations in 22 countries. Since the album's release in December 2013, the band has remained at the top of ReverbNation’s Chicago and US Blues charts. Red, Hot & Blue broke Top 25 on Living Blues Radio Report, as well as reached Top 30 on the Roots Music Report. The album has been listed as number 35 on AirPlay Direct’s – All Time Top 50 APD Blues/Jazz/Reggae Albums.

Members
"Killer" Ray Allison - Guitar, vocals (June 20, 1956 – October 6, 2016)
Chicago Slim (Daniel Ivankovich) - Guitar, vocals
Anji Brooks - Vocals
Carl Copeland – Bass
Scott Dirks - Harmonica
Roosevelt Purifoy Jr - Keyboards, Organ
Daron Walker – Drums
Kenny Anderson - Trumpet
Johnny Cotton – Trombone
Garrick Patten - Saxophone

Discography

References

American blues musical groups
Chicago blues ensembles